The Towson Tigers, formerly the Towson College Knights, are the athletics teams of Towson University. All of the major athletic teams compete in the Colonial Athletic Association with 19 Division I athletic teams (13 in women's sports, 6 in men's sports). Gymnastics competes in the EAGL conference, having rejoined the league in the Spring of 2012.

Since joining the CAA in 2001–02, the Tigers have won 16 league championships; the Tigers have won titles in football, baseball, men's lacrosse, women's lacrosse, men's soccer, men's golf, women's swimming and diving, and volleyball. In addition, the women's gymnastics program has captured six ECAC Championships over the last eight years (2005, 2006, 2007, 2008, 2009, 2010).

During an athletics history that traces its roots to the 1920s, Towson has sent teams and individual student-athletes to NCAA post-season competition in baseball, basketball, football, golf, gymnastics, lacrosse, soccer, swimming, track & field and volleyball.

In May 2011, the department broke ground on the SECU Arena, a new 5000-seat, state-of-the-art arena for basketball, volleyball and gymnastics.  The arena was completed in May 2013 and opened in June 2013.

Varsity teams
Towson University sponsors teams in six men's and thirteen women's NCAA sanctioned sports:

 * = The gymnastics team competes in the Eastern College Athletic Conference.

Changes since 2000 to the men's programs include the elimination of several varsity sports in the 2003–04 school year: indoor track, outdoor track, cross country, tennis.  Changes to the women's programs include the additions of golf in 2007. Men's soccer was eliminated in 2013.

Football

The Tigers won the 2011 CAA Championship with a 7–1 conference record. Towson became the first team in NCAA history to compete in the playoffs at all three levels of competition in football (DI, DII and DIII). Following the 2011 season, Head Coach Rob Ambrose won the Eddie Robinson Award as the top college football coach in Division I Football Championship Subdivision (formerly Division I-AA), and Towson freshmen running back Terrance West won the inaugural Jerry Rice Award as the most outstanding freshman player in Division I Football Championship Subdivision.

Basketball

Lacrosse

Towson's men's lacrosse team is a nationally known program, regularly appearing in the NCAA tournament with two NCAA finals appearances to their credit. In 1974, the Tigers finished with a 14–1 record and won the Division II national title with an 18–17 overtime win over Hobart. The team also reached the finals of the 1991 NCAA Division I Men's Lacrosse Championship, and reached the semifinals of the 2001 NCAA Division I Men's Lacrosse Championship. The Tigers maintain an annual rivalry with the Loyola Greyhounds (see Loyola–Towson lacrosse rivalry).

Notable non-varsity sports

Rugby
Founded in 1975, Towson University men's rugby club plays college rugby in Division 1AA in the MARC against local rivals from Maryland, DC, West Virginia and Pennsylvania. Towson rugby has been led by head coach Tony De Cesare, with assistance coach Tim Cahill.

In 2012, Towson reached the Division 2 national playoffs, defeating Boston University in the round of 16 and Colgate in the quarterfinals, before losing to Salisbury in the semifinals. Towson finished the 2012 season with a 14–5 record, ranked #5 in the nation in Division 2, with flyhalf Christian Lowe named to the All Division 2 team.
In the 2013 season, Towson again reached the Division 2 national playoffs.  Towson defeated Illinois State 34–19 in the round of 16, and defeated UNC-Wilmington 30–5 in the quarterfinals, before once again falling to rival Salisbury 23–10 in the semifinals.

CAA Championship teams

Men's
Baseball: 2013
Football: 2011, 2012
Golf: 2010
Lacrosse: 2003, 2004, 2005, 2013, 2015, 2016, 2019
Soccer: 2006
Swimming & Diving: 2021

Women's
Basketball: 2018-19
Lacrosse: 2005, 2008, 2009, 2012, 2013, 2014, 2016
Swimming and Diving: 2008, 2009, 2010, 2011, 2013, 2014, 2015
Track & Field (outdoor): 2017
Volleyball: 2004, 2019, 2020, 2021

Notable athletes

Football
 Sean Landeta
 Dave Meggett
 Jermon Bushrod
 Terrance West
 Jordan Dangerfield
 Tye Smith

Baseball
 Chris Nabholz
 Casper Wells

Basketball
 Tamir Goodman
 Gary Neal
 Jerrelle Benimon

Men's soccer
 Phil Greatwich
 Machel Millwood
 Nigel Marples

Gymnastics
 Kacy Catanzaro
 Julija Kovaliova

References

External links